Rio is an unincorporated community and census-designated place (CDP) in Washington Parish, Louisiana, United States.tates. It was first listed as a CDP in the 2020 census with a population of 137.

Demographics

2020 census

Note: the US Census treats Hispanic/Latino as an ethnic category. This table excludes Latinos from the racial categories and assigns them to a separate category. Hispanics/Latinos can be of any race.

Education
It is in Bogalusa City Schools, which operates Bogalusa High School.

References

Unincorporated communities in Washington Parish, Louisiana
Census-designated places in Washington Parish, Louisiana